The 4th Texas Cavalry Regiment was a unit of mounted volunteers from Texas that fought in the Confederate States Army during the American Civil War. The unit was organized in September 1861 with the aim of seizing New Mexico Territory. In 1862, the regiment served in the unsuccessful New Mexico Campaign. In 1863, it was in action at Galveston, Fort Bisland, Irish Bend, Second Donaldsonville, Kock's Plantation, Sterling's Plantation, and Bayou Bourbeau. In 1864, the regiment fought at Mansfield and Pleasant Hill in the Red River Campaign. The unit surrendered in May 1865.

See also
List of Texas Civil War Confederate units

Notes

References

Units and formations of the Confederate States Army from Texas
1861 establishments in Texas
1865 disestablishments in Texas
Military units and formations disestablished in 1865
Military units and formations established in 1861